Face to Face is a punk rock band from Victorville, California, formed in 1991 by frontman Trever Keith, bassist Matt Riddle and drummer Rob Kurth. The band rose to fame with their 1995 album Big Choice, featuring the radio hit "Disconnected" which received heavy rotation on KROQ radio in Los Angeles and appeared in the movies Tank Girl and National Lampoon's Senior Trip.

Face to Face officially split up in September 2004, allowing the band members time to focus on other projects.  During that time all the band members played in a number of post-Face to Face projects including Legion of Doom, Me First and the Gimme Gimmes, The Offspring and Saves the Day. In April 2008, after a four-year hiatus, Face to Face performed together for the first time at The Glasshouse in Pomona, California. Since then, the band has continued to perform and has released five more studio albums to date.

History

Beginnings (1987–1992)
Face to Face can trace its beginnings to 1987 when Trever Keith (vocals, synthesizers) and Matt Riddle (bass, background vocals), who had both been friends since high school, and formed a heavy metal band named Victoria Manor that also featured Todd "Rick" Atmire (guitars) and Matt Atmire (drums). Other than one demo tape they released in 1989, Victor Manor never released any albums and after they disbanded, Keith and Riddle formed a band named Zero Tolerance with drummer Rob Kurth and guitarist Mark Haake who were both Air Force members stationed at George Air Force Base outside of Victorville. Like Victor Manor, Zero Tolerance never released a full-length album, but they recorded one demo tape in 1990 with the aforementioned line-up. By the following year, the band decided to take a new musical direction and changed their name to Face to Face.  Shortly afterwards, guitarist Mark Haake left the band and the remaining members continued on as a three-piece.

The band continued to play frequently throughout the Inland Empire and Orange County and quickly became a local favorite alongside bands like The Offspring, Guttermouth, Voodoo Glow Skulls, and others. At a show in Montclair, CA in May 1991, the band met Bill Plaster of Dr. Strange Records and was offered a record deal.  After accepting Plaster's offer, Face to Face entered Westbeach Recorders studio located in Hollywood, CA in October 1991 to record songs for their first album, Don't Turn Away (1992). Once the recording was finished, Dr. Strange Records had difficulty raising the financial resources to have the recordings pressed; in the interim, the band met Jim Goodwin. Goodwin offered to record the band's newest songs for free so they entered the studio in August 1992 and recorded "Nothing New," "Pastel," and "Disconnected".  These three songs ended up being included on Don't Turn Away along with the songs recorded at Westbeach Recorders.

Success (1993–1997)
In 1993, following a three-week tour in Germany supporting Lagwagon, Face to Face added Chad Yaro as an additional guitarist and new manager Desi Benjamin and began writing material for a new record.  Before the band began recording the new material, they decided to sign a recording contract with a new major label and publishing deal which Desi Benjamin secured for them with JVC/Victory/A&M Records and E.M.I. Music Publishing. On the heels of the new recording contract, Face to Face entered the studio with producer Thom Wilson (of The Offspring fame) and began recording the album that became known as Big Choice.

After finishing the recording, Victory Music decided they wanted to test their distribution system with a new release.  To do so they assembled an EP of songs featured on several of the band's 7" records along with other unreleased recordings.  This EP was titled Over It and was released several weeks before Big Choice.  The EP contained a remixed version of the song "Disconnected". This version began to receive significant airplay from KROQ in Los Angeles, California. This drove the label to push the band to re-record "Disconnected" for Big Choice.  It was featured as a bonus track alongside a cover of the Descendents song "Bikeage".

After touring with bands such as Sublime, NOFX, The Mighty Mighty Bosstones, and The Offspring in 1995 supporting Big Choice, bassist Matt Riddle chose to leave the band. Riddle went on to play in 22 Jacks, Pulley, No Use for a Name, Implants, and most recently Fire Sale. The band replaced him with a then-unknown bassist, Scott Shiflett.  Scott's first show with the band was on December 2, 1995, at the Victorville Fairgrounds.

In 1996, Face to Face began writing and recording what was to become their third album self-titled. This was the first record without Matt Riddle, who had been Keith's songwriting partner.  Due to this, Keith wrote the majority of the songs on the album with some help from Shiflett and Yaro. In the studio, the band once again recruited Jim Goodwin to record and produce the record. Following the release of the album, they headlined the 1997 SnoCore Tour and joined the Warped Tour. Their song "I Won't Lie Down" was featured on the 1997 movie Mortal Kombat: Annihilation soundtrack.

Later years (1998–2004)
In 1998, it was announced that drummer Rob Kurth was leaving the band. To finish out the tour for their self-titled record, the band hired drummer Jose Medeles.  After the tour ended, Pete Parada joined the band as Kurth's permanent replacement.  With Parada behind the drums, the band recorded and released two more albums (with producer Chad Blinman), Ignorance Is Bliss (1999) and Reactionary (2000).  Following the release of Reactionary, long-time guitarist Chad Yaro left the band to focus on his family.

Following Yaro's departure, Face to Face decided to remain a three-piece and began writing material for their sixth studio album, How to Ruin Everything, which was released on Vagrant Records in 2002. Following the release of How to Ruin Everything, the band headlined The Warped Tour.

In the fall of 2003, the band began a temporary hiatus; however, the following year, they announced that their hiatus would be permanent.   They gave their fans a proper farewell with "The Only Goodbye Tour" of 2004 with supporting acts My Chemical Romance and Seconds to Go, which followed with a raucous Warped Tour finale in Boston.

Reunion and beyond (2008–present)
On January 29, 2008, Face to Face announced that the band would be reuniting for select shows in the US and internationally, with the lineup including Trever Keith on vocals and guitar, Scott Shiflett on bass and Chad Yaro returning on guitar. Later that same year the band launched a short U.S. tour with former Uprising drummer Danny Thompson replacing Pete Parada, who had recently joined The Offspring. This lineup recorded Face to Face's first studio album in nine years, Laugh Now, Laugh Later (2011), followed by Three Chords and a Half Truth (2013); both albums were released on Keith's label Antagonist Records. After the release of Three Chords and a Half Truth, Yaro once again left Face to Face and was replaced by Dennis Hill.

In September 2015, it was announced that the band had signed with Fat Wreck Chords and was headed to the Blasting Room in Fort Collins, Colorado to begin recording their ninth album. This album was released on March 4, 2016, and is titled Protection. In August 2018 the band released an acoustic record titled, Hold Fast.

In December 2017, the band released a visual history coffee table book, Face to Face: 25 Years of SoCal Punk, with author Aaron Tanner.

As of April 2020, according to an interview with Trever Keith, a new Face to Face album is in the works. The album No Way out but Through was released on September 10, 2021.

Band members
Current members
 Trever Keith – lead vocals, guitar (1991–present)
 Scott Shiflett – bass, vocals (1995–present)
 Danny Thompson – drums (2008–present)
 Dennis Hill – guitar, vocals (2015–present)

Past members
 Matt Riddle – bass, vocals (1991–1995)
 Rob Kurth – drums, vocals (1991–1998)
 Chad Yaro – guitar, vocals (1994–2000, 2008–2014)
 Pete Parada – drums (1998–2004)

Timeline

Discography

Studio albums
Don't Turn Away (1992)
Big Choice (1995)
Face to Face (1996)
Ignorance Is Bliss (1999)
Standards & Practices (1999)
Reactionary (2000)
How to Ruin Everything (2002)
Laugh Now, Laugh Later (2011)
Three Chords and a Half Truth (2013)
Protection (2016)
Hold Fast: Acoustic Sessions (2018)
No Way Out But Through (2021)

Footnotes

External links 

 Face to Face official website

Musical groups established in 1991
Fat Wreck Chords artists
Punk rock groups from California
Skate punk groups
Musical groups disestablished in 2004
Musical groups reestablished in 2008
People from Victorville, California
Pop punk groups from California
1991 establishments in California
Vagrant Records artists
A&M Records artists
Rise Records artists
JVC Records artists